Ricky Ben Wellard (born 9 May 1988) is an English semi-professional footballer who plays as a midfielder for Isthmian League club Bedfont Sports.

Career

Ashford Town (Middlesex)
Wellard was born in Hammersmith, London. He came through the ranks of the Ashford Town (Middlesex) and made his debut for the Tangerines against Stourport Swifts on 8 January 2005, as a late sub for Anthony Eggington. He went on to make 190 first team appearances for Ashford Town including scoring the winning goal in the 2009 Surrey Senior Cup final. During his time at the club Wellard was also groundsman at Short Lane. In the summer of 2008, AFC Wimbledon had a transfer bid rejected which was described as 'derisory' by the Ashford board. However, the Dons second bid the following summer was more successful for an undisclosed fee plus add-ons. At the time of the transfer, Wellard was one of only three players to have ever commanded a transfer fee at Ashford, with the others being Dannie Bulman and Richard Butler.

AFC Wimbledon
Wellard became a regular in the AFC Wimbledon side and made 43 appearances in his first season for the Dons as they didn't quite make the Conference play-offs. His second season at the club saw him move down the pecking order in central midfield in January after the arrival of James Mulley. In February 2011, Wellard was sent on loan to fellow Conference side Cambridge United on a month-long loan. However, he was recalled early from his loan by Terry Brown due to an injury crisis at the Kingsmeadow Stadium. He regained his place in the Dons' first team and eventually played in the 2011 Conference Play-off final win over Luton Town, which saw the Dons gain a place in the Football League. In May 2012, Wellard was released from the club due to the expiry of his contract.

Cambridge United
Wellard signed a two-year contract with The U's on 18 May 2012 following his release from AFC Wimbledon earlier in the month. U's boss Jez George was quick to snap up the midfielder early in the summer transfer window in a deal which saw the Londoner return to the Abbey Stadium on a permanent basis following a popular loan spell back in February 2011.

In November 2012, he joined Conference South side Salisbury City on a one-month loan deal.

Salisbury City
After a successful loan spell at Salisbury, he returned permanently, signing a contract until the end of the 2013–14 season. He featured in the squad regularly, and scored a vital free kick in the Conference South play-off final against Dover Athletic.

Sutton United
He signed for Sutton United in July 2014, and made his debut against Winchester City in a pre-season friendly.

Welling United
In May 2015, he signed for National League side Welling United on a free transfer.

Wealdstone
In 2016, he signed for Wealdstone. He left the club in May 2018.

Bedfont
On 25 December 2019, Wellard moved to Bedfont Sports.

Career statistics

Honours
AFC Wimbledon
Conference Premier play-offs: 2010–11

Salisbury City
Conference South play-offs: 2012–13

References

External links

1988 births
Living people
Footballers from Hammersmith
English footballers
Association football midfielders
Ashford Town (Middlesex) F.C. players
AFC Wimbledon players
Cambridge United F.C. players
Salisbury City F.C. players
Sutton United F.C. players
Welling United F.C. players
Hemel Hempstead Town F.C. players
Wealdstone F.C. players
Hampton & Richmond Borough F.C. players
Bedfont Sports F.C. players
Southern Football League players
National League (English football) players
English Football League players